Oktyabrsky is an urban locality (a work settlement) and the administrative center of Oktyabrsky District in Volgograd Oblast, Russia. Population:

References

Notes

Sources

Urban-type settlements in Volgograd Oblast
Renamed localities of Volgograd Oblast